Sherwood is the name of some places in the U.S. state of Ohio:
Sherwood, Defiance County, Ohio
Sherwood, Hamilton County, Ohio
 Sherwood, Ohio, fictional setting for the movie and musical Heathers

See also
 Sherwood Anderson Park in Clyde, Ohio